Cirsium flodmanii, commonly known as prairie thistle, Flodman's thistle, or (in French) chardon de Flodman, is a plant species native to Canada and the northern United States. It has been found in every Canadian province from Québec to Alberta, as well as from the northern Great Plains, northern Rocky Mountains, and western Great Lakes regions of the US, as well as northern parts of Vermont, New York, and Washington.

Flowers are usually purple, occasionally white. The plant generally is found in grasslands and pastures.

References

flodmanii
Flora of Canada
Flora of the United States
Plants described in 1912